My Fruit Psychobells...A Seed Combustible is maudlin of the Well's first album, released in 1999.

Track listing
All music by Toby Driver.  All lyrics as noted.

Personnel
Jason Byron - vocals 
Maria-Stella Fountoulakis - vocals
Greg Massi - guitar  
Toby Driver - guitar, bass, keyboard, vocals, clarinet
Jason Bitner - trumpet  
Andrew Dickson - drums
Sky Cooper - guitar (solo on "Undine And Underwater Flowers")

References

External links
Official Site of Dark Symphonies

1999 albums
Maudlin of the Well albums